Lin Hsin-hui (born 6 February 2002) is a Taiwanese footballer who plays as a forward for Taiwan Mulan Football League club Taipei Bravo and the Chinese Taipei women's national team.

International goals

References

2002 births
Living people
Women's association football forwards
Taiwanese women's footballers
Sportspeople from Taoyuan City
Chinese Taipei women's international footballers